Luiz Alberto do Nascimento Braga (born 12 April 1988), known better as Datinha, is a Brazilian beach soccer player who currently plays as a defender. A versatile player, he has previously been designated as a forward and a midfielder during his career.

Career
Previously a fisherman, Datinha, described as "shy", began pursuing beach soccer seriously in 2010, playing in his local State Championship in Maranhão, and subsequently the Brazilian National Championship. He was first called up to the Brazil national team in 2012.

He went on to win the 2017 FIFA Beach Soccer World Cup representing Brazil and claimed the Bronze Ball (third best player) award at the competition; he has also appeared at four other World Cups (2013, 2015, 2019 and 2021). In addition, he was named as one of the world's best three players at the 2018 Beach Soccer Stars awards.

Datinha is also a longtime member of Russian club Kristall, having scored over 200 goals and played in nearly 300 games for the team across all competitions between 2012 and 2021, during which time he has been a European champion four times and Russian league champion on six occasions. He was persuaded by fellow Brazilian internationals Bruno Xavier and Jorginho to pursue beach soccer in Russia. Fellow Brazilian association footballer Hulk has been an inspiration to Datinha during his career. He also continues to play for Sampaio Corrêa in Brazil.

Statistics
Country

Club

Achievements
As of July 2021

The following is a selection, not an exhaustive list, of the major international honours Datinha has achieved:

Country
FIFA Beach Soccer World Cup
Winner (1): 2017
World Beach Games
Winner (1): 2019
Intercontinental Cup
Winner (3): 2014, 2016, 2017
CONMEBOL qualifiers for the FIFA Beach Soccer World Cup
Winner (2): 2017, 2019
Copa América
Winner (2): 2016, 2018
Mundialito
Winner (2): 2016, 2017
South American Beach Games
Winner (1): 2019
South American Beach Soccer League
Winner (2): 2017, 2018

Club
Euro Winners Cup
Winner (4): 2014, 2015, 2020, 2021
Euro Winners Challenge
Winner (1): 2018
Mundialito de Clubes
Winner (1): 2015

Individual
FIFA Beach Soccer World Cup (1):
Bronze Ball: 2017
Beach Soccer Stars (2):
World's top 3 best players: 2018
World dream team: 2018
Euro Winners Cup (1):
Best player: 2015
Mundialito de Clubes (1):
Top scorer: 2015
CONMEBOL qualifiers for the FIFA Beach Soccer World Cup (1):
Top scorer: 2015

References

External links
Datimha, profile at Brazilian Beach Soccer Confederation (in Portuguese)
Datinha, profile at Beach Soccer Worldwide
Datinha, profile at ZeroZero.pt (in Portuguese)
Datinha, profile at Beach Soccer Russia (in Russian)

1988 births
Living people
Brazilian beach soccer players
People from Maranhão